Zelik is a Yiddish name, a form of Zelig. Notable people with the name include:

 Mirka Madeleine Zelik
Zelik Epstein
 Zelik Barditshever
Zelik Mogulesko, or Sigmund Mogulesko (1858-1914), singer, actor, and composer in the Yiddish theater, New York City

See also

Zellik
Zoellick